Rudolph Krejci (4 March 1929 - 9 December 2018) was a Czechoslovak-American philosopher and professor, who was the founder of the Philosophy and Humanities Programs at the University of Alaska Fairbanks, and founder and first dean of the university's College of Arts and Sciences in 1975. In 1997, after 37 years at the university, Krejci became Professor Emeritus of Philosophy and Humanities.

Biography 

Rudy Krejci was born in Hrušky, Moravia (then Czechoslovakia) in 1929. His father, a railwayman, was a Czechoslovak who received his basic education solely in German. His mother was a Moravian-Slovak with Czech education.

Krejci studied at high school in Kroměříž and Brno, where he was introduced to philosophy by professor Antonín Kříž, who translated Aristotle's work into the Czech language. His studies were terminated on May 1, 1949, due to his membership of an anticommunist dissident student group. Krejčí had to go into hiding in a secret room of his father's apartment, where he stayed for five years. In May 1954, with the help of his father, he escaped Czechoslovakia hiding in a coffin under a coal wagon covered with vinegar and mustard, and made it to Vienna, Austria. From 1954 to 1959 Krejčí studied at the University of Innsbruck, Austria, majoring in philosophy, psychology, Russian history and literature. In 1959 he became a Doctor of Philosophy.

Krejci then went to the United States to work as an engineer for Bechtel Corporation and Bethlehem Steel, and in 1960 he was offered a contract to teach Russian and German at the University of Alaska in Fairbanks. Two years later he established a Philosophy program, and 13 years after that he added a Humanities program. After one year as a dean of Arts and Letters he formed a new College of Arts and Sciences.

Krejci's career with the university almost ended during a political dispute with former University of Alaska president William Ransom Wood regarding Project Chariot, a scheme by the federal government to detonate up to six nuclear explosions along the northwest coast of Alaska to create a new deep water harbour for future mineral extraction. In response to Krejci's opposition to the project, Krejci said that "Wood came to me and told me: "If you go on as you do now, there is only one way, one way from Alaska, direct, down to lower states." As a result of Krejci's opposition, Project Chariot never happened.

In 2009, Governor Sean Parnell presented Krejci with the Governor's Awards for the Humanities for "Distinguished Service to the Humanities in the state of Alaska."

Philosophy work and ideology
Krejci was a life-long opponent of Nazism and Communism, and was a vocal supporter of intellectual and cultural freedom, even when his personal safety and freedom were threatened.

Krejci lectured on philosophy in the US, Canada, England, Europe and Asia and cooperated with the International Wittgenstein Symposium in Kirchberg, Austria, Siu's panetics in Washington D.C., Viktor Frankl's logotherapy in Vienna, and Takashima's humanistic anthropology in Tokyo. In 1997 Krejci became Professor Emeritus of Philosophy and Humanities after 37 years of service at the University of Alaska, Fairbanks.

Publications 

 Politics of Coexistence: a paper and lecture in English delivered at the University of Innsbruck to the United Nations Club. Lectures were used for students studying translations into various foreign languages.  Krejci's lecture was –ex tempore– translated into German, French and Italian, 1958.
 Essays "Betrachtungen": reports written on various topics for Radio Free Europe, Russian Radio Liberation, both in Munich, and BBC Radio in London.  Languages: Czech, German, English and Russian, 1954–1955.
 Russland und Europa: doctoral Dissertation at the University of Innsbruck, Ph.D. Philosophy, Psychology and Slavistics. University of Innsbruck, Austria, 1959.
 World Congress of the Communist Youth in Vienna: Krejci covered the event for Josef Josten, editor of exile magazine "Czechoslovak" in London together with Pavel Tigrid, Czech exile, residing  in Paris and publishing for monthly magazin "Svedectvi", July 1959.
 Apologia Philosophiae: Our Limits, Arctic Circle, University of Alaska Fairbanks 1962–63.  Program of Philosophy to be introduced at the UAF, written in form of a poem to William Wood, President of University of Alaska, Fairbanks.
 Borealis Institute of Cultural Studies: Chairman of the committee to establish Institute of Cultural Studies formulated during 1965–66 at the University of Alaska Fairbanks as a complementary institute to the Institute of Geophysics, Biology, Marine Science, and other scientifically oriented institutes, 1965–1966.
 Course program of Department of Philosophy: University of Alaska, Fairbanks starting on 200 level to 400 level, 1962-1963 / Introduction to Philosophy and Introduction to Logic.
 Wittgenstein and the paradoxes in Philosophy:  2nd International Wittgenstein Symposium, Kirchberg, Austria, 1977. Philpapers
 T.G.Masaryk – common denominatior of our cultural-political aims: Union of Fine Arts (SVU), answer to Vaclav Havel's Charter 77, Washington D.C., USA, 1978.
 Problem of the philosophical interpretation of African Humanities: University of California and Los Angeles (UCLA) – 1978.
 Re-emergence of the concept of consciousness in 20th Century Science and Philosophy: 9th International Wittgenstein Symposium, Kirchberg, Austria, 1984.
 Contemporary Philosophy and its foundations: 10th International Wittgenstein Symposium, Kirchberg, Austria, 1985.
 Concrete Logic of T.G. Masaryk – Yesterday and Today: 11th International Wittgenstein Symposium, Kirchberg, Austria, 1986.
 Apologia Philosophiae: Tokio – Dr. Takashima Institute, 1989.
 Realism and Anti-realism in the Philosophy of Science: Beiging International Conference of Philosophy and Science, Vol. 169, published in Kluwer Academic Publishers, 1992 
 From Quantum and the Tao to Panetics, Trilogy and Panetics: International Conference of Dr. Siu’s Panetics, Washington D.C., USA, 1991. 
 The last meeting with Sir Karl Popper in June 1994 in Kenley: First published in Czech at Masaryk University, Brno, Czech Republic 1998, . Rudolf Krejci: Last meeting with Sir Karl Popper, Studia philosophica B49, p 155-163, 2002  
 Travels Around the World 1893 – 1898 – Jan Eskymo Welzl: Translated from German into Czech, Paseka, Prague, Czech Republic, 1997.  
 
 
thumb|right|Memorial stone in Hubenov, Czech Republic, erected in front of local public school in honour of this event in 2013. Translation: "One hour before the end of the war, exactly at this place, Antonín Novák was shot by SS soldiers. His fellow friend Rudolf Krejčí survived, in order to continue fight against violence. Now he is a professor of Philosophy at University of Alaska in Fairbanks."

 References 

External links
 www.rudykrejci.com 
 "Dr. Rudy Krejci – Philosopher and Rebel" - Oral History documentary by Dan O'Neil on Archivegrid. (12:53)

Further reading
 Andrew Fusek Peters: The Professor of Philosophy, in Out of Order. Evan Brothers Limited, London, 2002, 
 Andrew Fusek Peters: At first to live, then to Philosophise. A poem to Rudi Krejci's 75th birthday. 2004
 Andrew Fusek Peters, Rudi SS Poem, Hubenov, Czechoslovak 1945, May 1–3
 Luděk Navara: Příběhy železné opony (Stories of Iron Curtain). Published in Host, Brno, 2004, 
 Michal Pehr: Czech Philosopher in Alaska.'' Americke Listy, 2007

2018 deaths
1929 births
Philosophers from Alaska
Czechoslovak defectors
Czechoslovak emigrants to Austria
Czechoslovak emigrants to the United States
University of Alaska Fairbanks faculty
Czech philosophers
People from Břeclav District
University of Innsbruck alumni
Bethlehem Steel people